That's Country was a New Zealand country and western television variety show, broadcast between 1980 and 1984 on TVNZ. The Show was hosted by Ray Columbus and featured local as well as international talent. Local talent included Ritchie Pickett, Peter Posa, Suzanne Prentice, Patsy Riggir and the Topp Twins. American artist Emmylou Harris and Dobie Gray also performed on the show.

The series aired on The Nashville Network in the United States in the 1980s.

References

External links
 Wendy Holcombe performs on That's Country

New Zealand music television series
1970s New Zealand television series
1980s New Zealand television series
1976 New Zealand television series debuts
1983 New Zealand television series endings
Country music television series